Galway Borough was a constituency represented in the Irish House of Commons until its abolition on 1 January 1801.

History
In the Patriot Parliament of 1689 summoned by James II, Galway Borough was represented with two members.

Members of Parliament, 1264–1801
1560 Jonoke Lynch and Peter Lynch
1585 Jonoke Lynch and Peter Lynch and Robert French
1613–1615 Geoffrey Lynch and Sir Valentine Blake, 1st Baronet
1634–1635 Sir Thomas Blake (expelled) and Nicholas Lynch
1639–1642 Sir Robuck Lynch, 2nd Baronet and Sir Valentine Blake, 3rd Baronet
1661–1666 Edward Eyre and John Eyre

1689–1801

Notes

References

Bibliography

Constituencies of the Parliament of Ireland (pre-1801)
Westminster constituencies in County Galway (historic)
Politics of Galway (city)
1264 establishments in Ireland
1800 disestablishments in Ireland
Constituencies established in 1264
Constituencies disestablished in 1800